The following is an incomplete list of festivals in the province of British Columbia, Canada.  Both single events and recurring festivals are included. This list includes festivals of diverse types, including regional festivals, commerce festivals, fairs, food festivals, arts festivals, religious festivals, folk festivals, and recurring festivals on holidays. A number of notable cultural and music festivals take place in British Columbia.

List of festivals

Ignite the Arts Festival, Penticton, BC
ArtsWELLS Festival of All Things Art
Billy Barker Days
Center of Gravity
Hataw Pinoy Philippine Summer Festival
Hyack Festival
Under the Volcano Festival
Canadian International Dragon Boat Festival
Celebration of Light
Crazy8s
Gung Haggis Fat Choy
Illuminares
Kootenay Burlesque Festival
Pacific National Exhibition
Parade of Lost Souls
Powell Street Festival
PuSh International Performing Arts Festival
Queer Arts Festival
Terrace Riverboat Days
Short Line Reading Series
Symphony of Fire
Vancouver Cherry Blossom Festival
Vancouver Fringe Festival
Vancouver Halloween Parade & Expo
Vancouver International Burlesque Festival
Vancouver International Dance Festival
Vancouver International Digital Festival
Vancouver International Sculpture Biennale
Vancouver Pride Festival
The Word on the Street (literary festival)

Food
Dine Out Vancouver Festival
Eat! Vancouver
Fort Langley Cranberry Festival

Film and theatre

Crazy8s 
DOXA Documentary Film Festival
Victoria Film Festival
Vancouver Asian Film Festival
Vancouver International Film Festival
Vancouver Queer Film Festival
Whistler Film Festival

Music

See also

List of festivals in Canada
Culture of British Columbia
Tourism in British Columbia

References

External links
 
2013 article on Vancouver festivals in the Vancouver Sun

Festivals
British Columbia
British